In Inuit mythology, Tootega is a wisened old goddess, who lives in a stone hut and has the ability to walk on water.

Inuit goddesses